The 1940 South Dakota Coyotes football team was an American football team that represented the University of South Dakota in the North Central Conference (NCC) during the 1940 college football season. In its seventh season under head coach Harry Gamage, the team compiled a 4–5–1 record (2–1–1 against NCC opponents), finished in third place out of seven teams in the NCC, and was outscored by a total of 162 to 109. The team played its home games at Inman Field in Vermillion, South Dakota.

Schedule

References

South Dakota
South Dakota Coyotes football seasons
South Dakota Coyotes football